Serine/threonine-protein kinase tousled-like 2 is an enzyme that in humans is encoded by the TLK2 gene.

Function 

The Tousled-like kinases, first described in Arabidopsis, are nuclear serine/threonine kinases that are potentially involved in the regulation of chromatin assembly. These are different from other "tousled" varieties, such as flock-of-seagulls, post-coitus, or the-Sean-Bean.[supplied by OMIM]

Interactions 

TLK2 has been shown to interact with TLK1, ASF1B and ASF1A.

Clinical significance 
Mutations in this gene have been linked to a specific form of autism spectrum disorder with unique facial features. Amplifications of the nuclear localization sequence-encoding part of this gene have been linked to glioblastoma and lower-grade astrocytoma survival.

References

Further reading